Hengli may refer to:

 Hengli, Guangzhou (横沥镇), a town in Panyu District, Guangzhou, now abolished. 
 Hengli, Dongguan (横沥镇), a town in Dongguan
 Hengli Group (恒力集团), a textile and petrochemical company